Serhiy Demchenko (born 27 September 1979) is a Ukrainian professional boxer. He held the European Union light-heavyweight title twice between 2016 and 2018, and has challenged twice for the European light-heavyweight title.

Professional career
Based in Rome throughout his career, Demchenko made his professional debut on 1 October 2005, scoring a first-round knockout against Karoly Gyorfi. On 10 May 2008, Demchenko won his first regional championship—the IBF Inter-Continental light-heavyweight title—by stopping Drago Janjusevic in four rounds. In his first attempt at winning the European Union light-heavyweight title, Demchenko lost a unanimous decision to Mehdi Amar on 17 October 2015. He found better success in his second attempt, on 12 March 2016, when he stopped Mirco Ricci in ten rounds to win the title.

Professional boxing record

References

External links

Super-middleweight boxers
Light-heavyweight boxers
Living people
1979 births
Ukrainian male boxers
Sportspeople from Sumy